Hack's law is an empirical relationship between the length of streams and the area of their basins. If L is the length of the longest stream in a basin, and A is the area of the basin, then Hack's law may be written as

for some constant C where the exponent h is slightly less than 0.6 in most basins. h varies slightly from region to region and slightly decreases for larger basins (>8,000 mi², or 20,720 km²). In addition to the catchment-scales, Hack's law was observed on unchanneled small-scale surfaces when the morphology measured at high resolutions (Cheraghi et al., 2018).

The law is named after American geomorphologist John Tilton Hack.

References 
 Hack, J., 1957, "Studies of longitudinal stream profiles in Virginia and Maryland", U.S. Geological Survey Professional Paper, 294-B.
 Rigon, R., et al., 1996, "On Hack's law" Water Resources Research, 32, 11, pp. 3367–3374.
 Willemin, J.H., 2000, "Hack’s law: Sinuosity, convexity, elongation". Water Resources Research, 36, 11, pp. 3365–3374.
 

Hydrology
Rivers
Geomorphology
Water streams
Power laws